Quicc! was a concept car and a planned series of electric cars, by DuraCar from Heerlen, Netherlands.  Company bankruptcy in 2009 derailed the latter plan, and the concept car design never entered production.

QUICC! DiVa 

QUICC! DiVa is a city distribution van. 

DuraCar had hoped to be producing the QUICC! on different locations in the proximity of its markets. In Germany, it was planned to be manufactured in collaboration with Karmann, but the latter company's bankruptcy in early 2009 left the larger manufacturing project in hiatus.

References

External links 
 DuraCar, Karmann Firms Remove Wraps From QUICC! DiVa Electric Van.
 6 Cool European Electric Cars Never Coming to the US

Electric concept cars